Chris Silvestro (born 16 March 1979, in Bellshill) is a Scottish former footballer. During his career, Silvestro played with Albion Rovers and Raith Rovers.

Career
Silvestro began his career with Albion Rovers in 1999 where he made over 150 appearances and scored 4 goals. After 6 years with the club, he signed for Scottish Division Two club Raith Rovers in May 2005. Silvestro stayed at Stark's Park for 4 seasons, before eventually leaving the club in 2009.

References

External links
 

Living people
1979 births
Albion Rovers F.C. players
Raith Rovers F.C. players
Footballers from Bellshill
Scottish footballers
Association football midfielders
Scottish Football League players